Saperdini is a tribe of longhorn beetles of the subfamily Lamiinae.

Taxonomy
 Bifidunguiglenea Lin & Tavakilian, 2012
 Cagosima Thomson, 1864
 Callundine Thomson, 1879
 Chlorisanis Pascoe, 1867
 Clavoserixia Breuning, 1954
 Conizonia Fairmaire, 1864
 Coptosia Fairmaire, 1864
 Cristoberea Breuning, 1954
 Cyaneophytoecia Breuning, 1950
 Dyenmonus Thomson, 1868
 Dystomorphus Pic, 1926
 Elongatoserixia Breuning, 1982
 Entelopes Guérin-Méneville, 1844
 Eudaphisia Pic, 1926
 Eutetrapha Bates, 1884
 Glenea Newman, 1842
 Gleneonupserha Breuning, 1949
 Glenida Gahan, 1888
 Gracilinitocris Breuning, 1950
 Hemicryllis Aurivillius, 1922
 Heteroglenea Gahan, 1897
 Kabylophytoecia Sama, 2005
 Leuconitocris Breuning, 1950
 Linda Thomson, 1864
 Loboberea Breuning, 1950
 Malloderma Lacordaire, 1872
 Mallosia Mulsant, 1863
 Mallosiola Semenov, 1895
 Mandibularia Pic, 1925
 Mecas LeConte, 1852
 Menesia Mulsant, 1856
 Menesida Gahan, 1907
 Metallonupserha Breuning, 1980
 Micromandibularia Pic, 1936
 Mimocagosima Breuning, 1968
 Mystrocnemis Quedenfeldt, 1882
 Nedytisis Pascoe, 1866
 Neonitocris Breuning, 1950
 Neoserixia Schwarzer, 1925
 Neoxantha Pascoe, 1856
 Nupserha Thomson, 1860
 Nupserhoglenea Breuning, 1963
 Oberea Mulsant, 1839
 Obereopsis Chevrolat, 1855
 Ossonis Pascoe, 1867
 Oxylia Mulsant, 1863
 Pannychella Gilmour, 1962
 Pannychina Gilmour, 1962
 Parablepisanis Breuning, 1950
 Paradystus Aurivillius, 1923
 Paraglenea Bates, 1866
 Paramallosia Fuchs, 1955
 Paramenesia Breuning, 1952
 Paranitocris Breuning, 1950
 Paraschoenionta Breuning, 1950
 Paraserixia Breuning, 1954
 Parastenostola Breuning, 1952
 Parathyestes Breuning, 1980
 Pardaloberea Pic, 1926
 Parentelopes Breuning, 1954
 Pareutetrapha Breuning, 1952
 Parobereopsis Breuning, 1956
 Phytoecia Dejean, 1835
 Poecilobactris Kolbe, 1897
 Praolia Bates, 1884
 Pseudochlorisanis Breuning, 1954
 Pseudoconizonia Breuning, 1956
 Pseudoglenea Gilmour & Breuning, 1963
 Pseudolinda Breuning, 1954
 Pseudonitocris Breuning, 1961
 Pseudonupserha Aurivillius, 1914
 Pseudophytoecia Breuning
 Pseudoschoenionta Breuning, 1954
 Pseudothyestes Breuning, 1980
 Saperda Fabricius, 1775
 Saperdoglenea Breuning, 1964
 Savang Breuning, 1963
 Schoenionta J. Thomson, 1868
 Scytasis Pascoe, 1867
 Serixia Pascoe, 1856
 Serixiophytoecia Breuning, 1950
 Spinoberea Breuning, 1954
 Stenostola Mulsant, 1839
 Stibara Hope, 1840
 Striophytoecia Breuning, 1969
 Thermistis Pascoe, 1867
 Thyestilla Aurivillius, 1923
 Trichonitocris Breuning, 1961
 Vespinitocris Breuning, 1950
 Zosne Pascoe, 1866

incertae sedis
 Saperda bilabilis Newman, 1850
 Saperda mellancholica Montrouzier, 1855
 Saperda punctata Montrouzier, 1855

References

 
Lamiinae